Monroe Lake is a reservoir located about 10 miles (16 km) southeast of Bloomington, Indiana, United States. Indiana's only federally protected U.S. Wilderness Area, the  Charles C. Deam Wilderness Area, is located on the south shore. The pool elevation (above sea level) is about 538 ft (164 m) year-round. During colder winters, limited ice fishing is available on protected backwater portions of the reservoir.

Ransburg Scout Reservation, a large Boy Scout camp comprising over 624 acres, is situated along the eastern shore with a private dock system in Siscoe Bay (also known as Boy Scout Bay). The largest marina situated on the lake is the Fourwinds Resort and Marina with over 800 boats.  The reservoir provides abundant fishing throughout the year, and recreational opportunities such as boating and water skiing attract visitors from throughout Indiana and the Midwest.

Construction
Construction on the lake began in 1960 and was finished in 1965 at a cost of $16.5 million.  Salt Creek was dammed south of Bloomington, Indiana and the reservoir fills the valley to the northeast of the dam extending into adjacent Brown County.  It was thought that Elkinsville, a town in southern Brown County, had to be abandoned due to the path of the backwaters. Therefore, the town was acquired through the power of eminent domain. Later, this was found not to be necessary; the result of a mistake in elevation estimates. The lake was designed as a primary water source for the City of Bloomington and to prevent flood damage downstream.  The lake was created and is still managed by the U.S. Army Corps of Engineers, Louisville District.

References

External links
 Monroe Lake page at Indiana Dept. of Natural Resources
 Monroe Lake page at U.S. Army Corps of Engineers
 U.S. Army Corps of Engineers, Louisville District
 Lake-Monroe.com

Protected areas of Brown County, Indiana
Protected areas of Monroe County, Indiana
Monroe
Hoosier National Forest
Monroe
United States Army Corps of Engineers dams
Nature centers in Indiana
Bodies of water of Brown County, Indiana
Bodies of water of Monroe County, Indiana